This is a list of aircraft produced by Sukhoi, a Russian aircraft manufacturer.

Products

Production Aircraft

Military Aircraft

Civilian Aircraft

Experimental aircraft

Su-1/I-330: high-altitude fighter, 1940
Su-3/I-360: improved Su-1, 1942
Su-4/BB-3: prototype version of Su-2 re-engined with a M-90 engine, 1941
Su-5/I-107: prototype motorjet fighter, 1945
Su-6: ground attack aircraft, 1942
Su-7: prototype mixed-power high-altitude interceptor, 1944
Su-8/DDBSh: ground attack aircraft, 1943
Su-9: jet fighter, 1946
Su-10: four-engine jet bomber, 1946
Su-11: prototype twin-engine fighter developed from the Su-9, resembled the Me 262, 1946
Su-12: observation plane, 1947
Su-13: prototype twin-engine jet fighter developed from the Su-11, 1947
Su-15: fighter-interceptor, 1949
Su-17: fighter, 1949
Sukhoi-Gulfstream S-21: a supersonic business jet design.
Sukhoi KR-860: doubledeck superjumbo jet design.
Su-37 ("Terminator"): an improved Su-35
Su-28 / Su-25UB: trainer and demonstrator
Su-25TM / Su-39: 1984, ground attack aircraft, optimised for anti-tank use
Su-38: light agricultural aircraft
S-32/37: multirole fighter (was marketed for a time under the designation Su-47)
Su-47: experimental aircraft
P-1: 1958, interceptor fighter
T-3: 1956, fighter
T-4/100: 1972, supersonic bomber, similar in concept to XB-70 Valkyrie, which was developed by Sukhoi during the 1960s and 1970s.
T-49: prototype interceptor, modernized variant of Su-11, 1960
T-60S: intermediate range bomber.
Su-57: fifth generation fighter. Basic future aircraft of Russian Frontline Aviation. Maiden flight January 29, 2010.
Sukhoi/HAL FGFA: FGFA is a derivative project from the Sukhoi Su-57 being developed by the Sukhoi OKB and HAL for the Indian Air Force (FGFA is the official designation for the Indian version). Sukhoi/HAL FGFA project cancelled after India left the Su 57 project

Planned aircraft
Sukhoi S-54
Sukhoi Superjet 130

Note: The Sukhoi OKB has reused aircraft designations, for example: the Su-9 from 1946 and the later Su-9 from 1956, the former was not produced in quantity. Sukhoi prototype designations are based on wing layout planform. Straight and swept wings are assigned the "S" prefix, while delta winged designs(including tailed-delta) have "T" for a designation prefix.

Example: S-37 and T-10.

Unmanned Aerial Vehicles
Sukhoi Zond-1

References

Sukhoi
aircraft